Frazier Okal Ochieng (born 14 October 1975) is a Kenyan former footballer who played as a right winger.

Career
Ochieng played club football for Shabana, Gor Mahia and FC Münsingen.

He earned 1 cap for the Kenyan national team.

References

1975 births
Living people
Kenyan footballers
Kenya international footballers
Shabana F.C. players
Gor Mahia F.C. players
FC Münsingen players
Association football wingers
Kenyan expatriate footballers
Kenyan expatriate sportspeople in Switzerland
Expatriate footballers in Switzerland